Christopher Rowley (born 1948) is an American writer specializing in the science fiction and fantasy genres. He is also a former journalist and television screenswriter.

Christopher Rowley was born in 1948 in Lynn, Massachusetts, to an American mother and an English father. Educated primarily at Brentwood School, in Essex, England, he became a London-based journalist in the 1970s. In 1977 he moved to New York City, and now lives in upstate New York's Hudson Valley.

Rowley's first science fiction novel was The War for Eternity, published in 1983, which won the Compton Crook Award for best first novel. The War for Eternity led to three further novels set in the same future: The Black Ship, The Founder, and To a Highland Nation. His novel Starhammer has been cited by computer programmer Jason Jones as an important literary influence in the creation of the Halo video game series by Bungie. Starhammer was followed by The Vang: The Military Form and The Vang: The Battlemaster to form a loosely connected trilogy (all published by Ballantine Books) spanning several thousand years and involving different sets of characters in each book.

In the 1990s, Rowley switched to the fantasy genre with the success of his first novel for Roc Books, Bazil Broketail. This novel was set on the imaginary world Ryetelth and involved the adventures of battledragons and the boys that care for them in the service of the legions of the nine cities of the Argonath. Bazil Broketail's adventures continued with Sword for a Dragon, Dragons of War, Battledragon, A Dragon at World's End, Dragons of Argonath, and Dragon Ultimate. The Ryetelth novels also include a tangential story, told in The Wizard and the Floating City, that interrupted the sequence of Bazil Broketail novels and introduced new characters and a broadening of the conceptual framework of the entire series. In the 1980s and 1990s he also co-wrote two television animated series by Robert Mandell, The Adventures of the Galaxy Rangers and Princess Gwenevere and the Jewel Riders.

After the conclusion of the Bazil Broketail series, he produced the Books of Arna, a trilogy set on Arna, a world colonized by humans in the far future. This series began with The Ancient Enemy, continued with The Shasht War, and concluded with Doom's Break. In February 2009, Rowley's first illustrated novel, titled Arkham Woods, a supernatural tale of horror inspired by the Cthulhu Mythos of H.P. Lovecraft and published by Seven Seas.

References

External links
  (2005-2009)
 
 Christopher Rowley at The Encyclopedia of Science Fiction

1948 births
20th-century American novelists
21st-century American novelists
American fantasy writers
American horror writers
American male journalists
American male novelists
American male screenwriters
American science fiction writers
American television writers
American male television writers
Living people
People educated at Brentwood School, Essex
Novelists from New York (state)
20th-century American male writers
21st-century American male writers
20th-century American non-fiction writers
21st-century American non-fiction writers
Screenwriters from New York (state)